Regnauville is a commune in the Pas-de-Calais department in the Hauts-de-France region of France.

Geography
Regnauville is located 18 miles (29 km) southeast of Montreuil-sur-Mer on the D928 road.

Population

Places of interest
 The church of St.Jacques, dating from the sixteenth century.
 A cheesemakers

See also
Communes of the Pas-de-Calais department

References

Communes of Pas-de-Calais
Artois